Ferrissia californica is a species of small freshwater limpet, an aquatic gastropod mollusk in the family Planorbidae.

Description
This species has a limpet like shell. In captivity the shell is clear but in the wild it is light to dark brown.

Distribution 
This species originates from North America. It is introduced in several countries and islands including:

Czech Republic
Bulgaria
Austria
Spain
Moldova
Germany
Netherlands
Poland
Slovakia
Great Britain
Portugal
Algeria
Japan
Australia
 and others

Habitat
Ferrissia californica lives in streams, rivers, lakes, ponds, etc. It can be found on rocks, wood debris, aquatic plants, and dead leaves.

Diet
Ferrissia californica eats mostly diatoms.

Life cycle
Ferrissia californica is a obligate self-fertilizer. It lays eggs that are 0.6 mm and contain one juvenile. The eggs hatch in about seven days. They mature at between four and five weeks. Adults are about 2 mm.

Human use
Ferrissia californica is found in the aquarium trade and is considered an aquarium pest.

References

External links

Planorbidae
Gastropods described in 1863